Paris by Night 53: Thiên Đường Là Đây (Paradise is Here), was a music and entertainment program produced by Thúy Nga, released in early 2000 on a 3-set VHS. The show was made with a live audience at Thúy Nga's former anchor studio in the Studios de Paris media complex in Paris, France to welcome the arrival of the new millennium, and was hosted by Nguyễn Ngọc Ngạn and Nguyễn Cao Kỳ Duyên. The show mainly consists of duet performances, and includes a segment commemorating the works of late composer Văn Phụng, who died in 1999. In 2006, the show was republished on 2 DVDs. On November 10, 2016, the show was uploaded in three parts to the official Thúy Nga Productions YouTube channel.

Track listing

Notes
 Rights to the songs "Thiên Đuờng Là Đây", "Hoài Niệm Dấu Yêu", "Tình Yêu, Nỗi Nhớ", "Đời Vẫn Lầm Than", "Một Lần Được Yêu", "Vì Sao Em Ơi", "Đường Tình Hai Lối", and "Hẹn Hò Đêm Trăng" (lyrics only) belonged to Thúy Nga Productions from the time of the VHS release in 2000. By the 2006 DVD release, rights remained only to "Một Lần Được Yêu", "Đường Tình Hai Lối", and "Hẹn Hò Đêm Trăng".

References 

Paris by Night